Quota players is a term in sport referring to the limit of foreign players on a domestic team.

Rugby League
An overseas player quota restricts the number of foreign players that rugby league clubs in the Super League, Championship, and League 1 competitions are allowed to sign. Currently, Super League and Championship clubs are allowed a maximum of 5 foreign players, while League 1 clubs are allowed just 2.

For the Canadian-based Toronto Wolfpack, American, Canadian, and Jamaican players do not count towards the foreign quota.

Previously, the maximum number of foreign players for each Super League club was three. Harlequins RL were permitted four quota players as they are considered to be a non-heartland team. The Welsh team Crusaders is allowed 14 overseas players and French side Catalans Dragons are allowed eight non-French players. Championship teams were only allowed one quota player, aside from Toulouse who have five foreign players.

Exceptions
There are three exceptions for a player to avoid quota player status. Those are listed below:

1. When a player has played for a rugby team for six years, he is eligible to gain British citizenship and does not count under the quota.

2. If the player has a passport for any EU nation or a Kolpak nation.

3. If the player is from a Kolpak nation such as Papua New Guinea, Samoa or Tonga.

Evolution
Each club is allowed

2008

At least 5 home grown players.

No more than 5 overseas quota players.

No more than 10 overseas trained players inc the 5 quota players.

Rest of the squad to be from players trained within the same federation.

2009

At least 6 home grown players.

No more than 5 overseas quota players.

No more than 8 overseas trained players inc quota players.

Rest of squad to be from players trained within same federation.

2010

At least 7 home grown players.

No more than 5 quota players.

No more than 6 overseas trained players inc quota players.

Rest of squad to be from players trained within same federation.

2011

At least 14 home grown players.

No more than 5 quota players.

No more than 5 overseas trained players inc quota players.

Rest of squad to be from players trained within same federation.

KEY

Home grown players - any player still under 21 and/or has completed 3 years service with the same clubs academy set up.

Same federation - any player still under 21 and/or has completed 3 years service with other clubs academy set ups within UK (for UK SL clubs) or France (for Catalans etc.)

Overseas quota players - as per current rules i.e. Anyone unable to prove origins within EU or Kolpak countries.

Overseas trained - any other overseas player (EU passport or Kolpak etc.)

2023 Super League quota players
Foreign non-quota players that are followed by parentheses would ordinarily count towards the foreign quota, but have obtained passport, through their parental heritage, birthplace, or residency, in order to be classed as a non-quota player. Players with unknown status may or may not be using such a method.

External links
 Leeds Today Rugby Columnists- Overseas restriction is the right way to go

References

Rugby league-related lists
Rugby league in the United Kingdom
Sports rules and regulations